The Sabzevar expedition was a politically decisive event in Nader's career where he in effect turned from mere commander-in-chief of Tahmasp's forces into the real power behind the throne (although technically this still was a government in exile as the Gilzai Afghans were in control of Isfahan). The expedition was launched mainly due to Tahmasp's own incompetence and ill-thought attempt at curbing the powers of his upstart general and military genius.

Prelude to Conflict 
After the brief campaign in southern Khorasan that culminated in the battle of Sangan Nader was determined on a more ambitious plan of action which involved the taking of Herat in order to completely subdue the Abdali Afghans. He thus agreed with his Monarch Tahmasp II that they would invade southward were their paths would converge, leading to the final destination of Herat. Unfortunately for Nader (and for himself as events would later show) Tahmasp was increasingly distrustful, perhaps jealous of Nader and under the pressure of many in his entourage did not march southward but instead north where he proclaimed Nader a traitor and asked loyal subjects to join in the battle against him.

Nader's Response 
Nader's reaction was immediate. He left his brother in Mashad and set off with the bulk of his men and pursued Tahmasp north where the Shah was joined by the Qarachoorloo Kurds. The Shah was besieged by Nader in the fort "Kohne Sangan" where Nader brought up his guns to subject it to a heavy bombardment. The Kurds who came to relieve the Shah were lured into a ditch were Nader had concocted an elaborate trap in which he forced the Kurds into an ignominious surrender. Tahmasp cognisant of his precarious position sent a minister to negotiate with Nader. Nader claimed to be in fear of his life and when he was assured there was no cause for fear as the Tahmasp had given his word that no harm should befall him he mocked these guarantees mentioning that the Shah had also given his word that no harm would befall Fathali Khan but it only took a day before he was decapitated. Despite this he relented, alas for Tahmasp this did not entail a true return to kingship in any other way than in name, from this point he would function as Nader's stooge.

Pacification of the North 
After taming Tahmasp, Nader advanced on Astarabad, then further into Mazandaran bringing the southern coast of the Caspian sea under his control. All his efforts bore fruit as he had secured Khorasan from all quarters and now with a subservient monarch under his thumb he could advance down onto Herat with both security as well as Royal legitimacy.

See also
 Military of the Afsharid dynasty of Persia
 Kandahar
 Safavid dynasty
 Hotaki dynasty
 Persia
 Greater Khorasan

Sources
 Michael Axworthy, The Sword of Persia: Nader Shah, from Tribal Warrior to Conquering Tyrant Hardcover 348 pages (26 July 2006) Publisher: I.B. Tauris  Language: English 

Conflicts in 1728
1720s in Iran
Battles involving Safavid Iran
History of Razavi Khorasan Province